Capo Nord is the third studio album by Italian singer-songwriter Alice, released in 1980 on EMI Music.

The album includes Alice's Italian breakthrough single "Il vento caldo dell'estate", her first collaboration with composer and singer Franco Battiato.

After Alice won the Sanremo Music Festival in 1981 with "Per Elisa", Capo Nord was re-released in certain territories and then added the track as A5.

Alternate versions of both "Rumba Rock" (then retitled "Hispavox") and "Il vento caldo dell'estate" were included on the 1987 album Elisir. "Il vento caldo dell'estate" was again re-recorded in 2000 and included in the career retrospective Personal Jukebox.

Track listing
Side A
"Il vento caldo dell'estate (Franco Battiato, Giusto Pio, Alice) – 3:34
"Bazar (Alice, Franco Battiato, Giusto Pio) – 3:03
"Sarà" (Alice, Franco Battiato, Giusto Pio) – 3:01
"Lenzuoli bianchi" (Alice, Franco Battiato, Giusto Pio) – 3:34
"Una sera di novembre" (Alice, Franco Battiato, Giusto Pio) – 3:03

Side B
"Sera (Alice) – 3:48
"Bael" (Alice, Franco Battiato, Giusto Pio) – 3:44
"Rumba Rock" (also known as "Hispavox"; Alice, Franco Battiato, Giusto Pio) – 4:14
"Guerriglia urbana" (Alice, Giusto Pio, Franco Battiato) – 4:06

Personnel
 Alice – lead vocals, synthesizer tracks A1, A3, A5
 Mauro Spina – drums
 Stefano Cerri – bass guitar
 Cosimo Fabiano – bass guitar track B4
 Alberto Radius – guitar, sitar
 Giusto Pio – violin
 Filippo Destieri – keyboard instruments
 Mark Harris – piano
 Roberto Colombo – keyboards tracks A3, A4
 Lino "Capra" Vaccina – timpani

Production
 Angelo Carrara – record producer
 Franco Battiato – musical arranger
 Giusto Pio – musical arranger
 Enzo "Titti" Denna – sound engineer
 Recorded and mixed at Capolago Sound Studios, Milan
 Luciano Tallarini – graphic design
 Mauro Balletti – photography

External links

1980 albums
Alice (singer) albums
EMI Records albums
Italian-language albums